"You Don't Seem to Miss Me" is a song written by Jim Lauderdale, and recorded by American country music artist Patty Loveless featuring backing vocals from George Jones.  It was released in September 1997 as the first single from her album Long Stretch of Lonesome. The song won Loveless and Jones the 1998 Country Music Association Award for Musical Event of the Year.

The song charted for 20 weeks on the Billboard Hot Country Singles and Tracks chart, reaching number 14 during the week of December 13, 1997.

In 2020, Josh Turner recorded a version of the song featuring Runaway June on backing vocals for his album Country State of Mind.

Chart positions

References 

1997 singles
Patty Loveless songs
George Jones songs
Josh Turner songs
Runaway June songs
Male–female vocal duets
Songs written by Jim Lauderdale
Song recordings produced by Emory Gordy Jr.
Epic Records singles
1997 songs